Anadoras weddellii is a species of thorny catfish that is found in Argentina, Brazil, Bolivia and Paraguay. This species grows to a length of  SL. The IUCN Red List considers Anadoras regani a junior synonym of Anadoras weddellii, but FishBase and the Catalog of Fishes regard it as valid.

The fish is named in honor of British physician-botanist Hugh Algernon Weddell (1819–1877), who presented the type specimen in the form of a dried skin and a drawing of the fish.

References

Doradidae
Catfish of South America
Taxa named by François-Louis Laporte, comte de Castelnau
Fish described in 1855